Tigard may refer to:

 Tigard, Oregon
 Tigard Transit Center
 Tigard (animal), a tiger/leopard hybrid